Wu Kang-ren (born 24 November 1982), also known as Chris Wu, is a Taiwanese actor and model.

He debuted in the short film Fragile in Love: Poetry in Motion in 2007, and first came to attention for his role in the 2009 television series Autumn's Concerto. He received his first acting award at the 18th Asian Television Awards for Best Actor in a Leading Role for his performance in the 2012 TV series Emerging Light.

Early life
Wu was born on November 24, 1982 in Kaohsiung, Taiwan. He attended Kaohsiung Municipal Chung-Cheng Industrial High School. He lived with his mother after the divorce of his parents, and began working at 14, after graduating from junior high school, to support his family. He worked in restaurants, stalls, and supermarkets. He also tried being an on-site construction welder despite his lack of skill, receiving burns in the eyes as a consequence. After his conscription, he began working in a bar as a bartender. It was during this time that he was discovered by Li Qiyuan, a director who made him enter the entertainment industry.

Career

2007–2009: Acting debut and recognition
He started his career as a model, but he moved to being an actor with his debut performance in a gay role in Fragile in Love: Poetry in Motion (沿海岸線徵友). Directed by Mickey Chen and Chi Chen Jun, the short film was featured at The LGBT Civil Rights Movement Film Festival and at the Tokyo International Lesbian & Gay Film Festival among others. His first television miniseries came the afterwards in Talking With You Boyfriend's Ex-Girlfriend (與男友的前女友密談). The mini-series was awarded the Best Mini-series Screenplay Award and the Best Editing Award at the 43rd Golden Bell Awards in 2008. The same year, he was cast in Hong Kong film Miao Miao with actors Ko Chia-yen and Wing Fan. The film was selected at the 2009 Melbourne International Film Festival, but it was later pulled out due to controversies about China's boycott against the film festival, as well as premiering at the 59th Berlin International Film Festival. The film was also screened at the 11th Taipei Film Festival.

In 2009, Talking With You Boyfriend's Ex-Girlfriend'''s director Chen Hui Jing cast him once again in his first idol drama Autumn's Concerto starring Vanness Wu and Ady An, where he played the role of Hua Tuoye. In later years, he stated that he was often reprimanded by Li Qiyuan as he had difficulties delivering his lines well in shootings. The series was received favorably by viewers.

2010–2012: Continued project offers
Wu started to receive more television and film projects. In TTV's Zhong Wu Yan, he played the character of Howard, a blind man who finds love in Wu Yen, played by Cheryl Yang. He also starred in When Love Comes which garnered multiple nominations from different award-giving ceremonies.

During the press conference of TTV's Local Hero in 2011, Wu stated that he accidentally injured his left hand while shooting. He still participated in their scheduled charity event game that requires peeling fruits despite his hand injury, nevertheless, because he stated that he wanted the kids to enjoy. A year later, he was cast in four more television series. Among them is TTV's What Is Love co starring Jade Chou.

In 2012, Wu was cast in the role of Rong Guang, a farmer raising his son as a single parent, in the film The Third Wish. In preparation for the role, who is a skinny farmer to be diagnosed of Amyotrophic lateral sclerosis (ALS), Wu started running 5-kilometer races in the hot sun, and ate only boiled eggs and guava. He lost 8 kilograms of weight in 10 days. He also started acting as a father to child actor Chen Yu-cheng a week before filming began to study the father-and-son's lifestyle.

2013–present: First acting award
I was not born an actor... These experiences (doing manual labor jobs at a young age) made me aware of how money is earned that I try my best to be a hardworking actor. — Wu Kang-jen

In January, Wu was cast in TTV's King Flower co-starring James Wen and Nikki Hsieh. He played the character role of Ouyang Tai, the GM of Shen Da Realty who was engaged to Du Liang Yan, but was later killed by accident. The series consistently topped the viewers' ratings during its timeslot, garnering a 1.57 total average by the end of the series. Before the year ended, his performance in the 2012 TV series Emerging Light (愛在旭日升起時) earned him the Best Actor in a Leading Role award at the 18th Asian Television Awards on December 5, 2013 held in Singapore.

In 2014, he played the role of Zhou Shu Yu and David in Rock N' Road and Winnie the Boob (小胸維妮的幸福旅程) respectively. He was once again paired with Judy Chou, his co-star in What Is Love, in the latter series. He also acted alongside Ella Chen in The Lying Game (謊言遊戲) towards the end of the year. From late 2015 to early 2016, he starred  in the period drama A Touch of Green as a young fighter pilot, for which he won the award for best actor in a leading role at the Golden Bell Awards 2016.

Personal life
He was in a relationship with White Ant co-star Aviis Zhong from 2015 to 2017. Wu went public with his relationship with The Perfect Match'' co-star, Ivy Shao in November 2020. They had previously dated for a year in 2018 before getting back together.

Filmography

Television

Film

Music video appearances

Discography

Soundtrack contributions

Awards and nominations

References

External links

 
 
  Wu Kang-ren on Sina Weibo

1982 births
Living people
21st-century Taiwanese male actors
Taiwanese male television actors
Taiwanese male film actors
Taiwanese male models
Male actors from Kaohsiung